Ian Paton (born 21 February 1957) is a former Australian rules footballer who played with Hawthorn in the VFL.

Paton played the first half of his career as the second ruckman to Don Scott and it was in that capacity that he was part a member of Hawthorn's premiership winning side in 1978, starting the game in the back pocket. By the 1983 Grand Final, Scott had left and Paton was the first ruck, earning his second premiership. He would soon be relegated again though with the arrival of Greg Dear and he spent the 1986 season as captain of the Hawthorn reserves before returning to his native Tasmania the following year. As captain-coach of South Launceston he won three best and fairest awards.

References

1957 births
Living people
Hawthorn Football Club players
Hawthorn Football Club Premiership players
South Launceston Football Club players
Tasmanian State of Origin players
Australian rules footballers from Tasmania
Tasmanian Football Hall of Fame inductees
Two-time VFL/AFL Premiership players